Riad Beyrouti (born 6 May 1944 in Damascus – died 4 November 2019 in Honfleur, France) was a Syrian painter. He lived in Lower Normandy from 1969 until his death.

Biography 
Riad Beyrouti graduated from the Damascus National School of Fine Arts, where he had majored in sculpture. He moved to France in 1969 and attended l'École nationale supérieure des Beaux-Arts in Paris, majoring in sculpture. César Baldaccini was in charge of the sculpture department at that time.

Beyrouti took part in various exhibitions in Caen and Honfleur.

Works

Sculpture
 Platon, 1968
 Man And Time, 1968

Painting
 Ink painting
 Oil painting

Pricing
An ink painting on paper (54x58 cm) was acquired by the Lower Normandy region on 24 February 1984 at the price of 7200 Frs.

References

External links
 
 Riad Beyrouti's official web site

1944 births
2019 deaths
Contemporary painters
Syrian painters
People from Damascus
Syrian male artists
Syrian contemporary artists